Proserpio is a comune (municipality) in the Province of Como in the Italian region Lombardy, located about  north of Milan and about  east of Como. The name comes from the Roman goddess Proserpina.

Proserpio borders the following municipalities: Canzo, Castelmarte, Erba, Longone al Segrino.

Demographic evolution

References

Cities and towns in Lombardy